Sharon Johansen (born October 11, 1948) is an American model and actress.  She was Playboy magazine's Playmate of the Month for its October 1972 issue. Her centerfold was photographed by Alexas Urba.

Johansen was born in Norway, but when she was a year old her family moved to Wisconsin.

For a brief time, Johansen worked as a receptionist for Pierre Salinger.

She posed nude for the December 1979 Playboy pictorial "Playmates Forever!".

Select filmography
 Charlie's Angels – "He Married an Angel" (1981) TV Episode .... Ms. Fricke
 The Jerk (1979) as Mrs. Lenore Hartounian
 Your Three Minutes Are Up (1973) as Ilsa Johansen
 Barnaby Jones – "To Catch a Dead Man" (1973) TV Episode .... Waitress
 Columbo: Dagger of the Mind (1972/TV) as Miss Dudley

References

External links

 

1970s Playboy Playmates
1948 births
Living people
Norwegian emigrants to the United States
Female models from Wisconsin
21st-century American women